P'yŏngch'ŏn station is a freight-only railway station in Haeun 1-dong, P'yŏngch'ŏn-guyŏk, P'yŏngch'ŏn, North Korea. It is the terminus of the P'yŏngyanghwajŏn Line of the Korean State Railway.

The station is a single track with spurs to serve the Posok Korean Foreign Trade Company in Haeun 2-dong, and the Pot'onggang Organic Fertiliser Factory in Chŏngpy'ŏng-dong.

References

Railway stations in North Korea
Buildings and structures in Pyongyang
Transport in Pyongyang